is a Tongan born Japanese rugby union player who plays as a Flanker.

References

1991 births
Living people
Rugby union flankers
Rugby union players at the 2018 Asian Games
Asian Games silver medalists for Japan
Medalists at the 2018 Asian Games
Asian Games medalists in rugby union
Sunwolves players
Japanese rugby union players
Saitama Wild Knights players
Hanazono Kintetsu Liners players